The 1918 Iowa gubernatorial election was held on November 5, 1918. Republican nominee William L. Harding defeated Democratic nominee Claude R. Porter with 50.55% of the vote.

General election

Candidates
Major party candidates
William L. Harding, Republican
Claude R. Porter, Democratic 

Other candidates
Andrew Engle, Socialist
M. L. Christian, Prohibition

Results

References

1918
Iowa
Gubernatorial